Blaine Township is a township in Wright County, Iowa, USA.

References

Cities, towns, villages
 Dows
 Galt

School districts
 Clarion-Goldfield-Dows Community School District
 Belmond-Klemme Community School District

Notable Locations
 Bingham Park (south of Rowan)
 Iowa River
 Wright County Freedom Rock - Dows
 Dows Historic District
  - Quasdorf Blacksmith Museum
  - Rock Island Depot/Welcome Center
  - Fillmore Building/Dows Mercantile
  - Vernon No. 5 Schoolhouse Museum
  - Evans Prairie Home
 Dows Community Convention Center
 Dows Community Library
 Dows Swimming Pool & Campgrounds
 Dows Tiger Football Field & Track
 Dows City Park
 Dows School Playground

Churches
 Dows First Lutheran Church
 Dows United Methodist Church
 Sovereign Grace Church - Dows (former First Presbyterian Church building)
 The Living God (former Dows Pharmacy building)

Cemeteries
 Fairview Cemetery - Dows
 Galt Cemetery

Gas Stations
 Casey's Genral Store - Dows

Groceries
 Dows Community Grocery

Political districts
 Iowa's 4th congressional district
 State House District 55
 State Senate District 28

Townships in Wright County, Iowa
Townships in Iowa